Otidea concinna is a species of apothecial fungus belonging to the family Pyronemataceae. This rather uncommon European species appears from late summer to autumn as vivid yellow elongated "ears" in small groups in woodland and parkland. Compared to some species of the genus, O. concinna looks like the tops of the 'ears' have been chopped off.

Similar species include O. alutacea and O. microspora.

References

Pyronemataceae
Fungi described in 1774
Fungi of Europe
Taxa named by Christiaan Hendrik Persoon